The 2005–06 CEV Champions League was the 47th edition of the highest level European volleyball club competition organised by the European Volleyball Confederation.

League round

Pool A

|}

Pool B

|}

Pool C

|}

Pool D

|}

Playoffs

Playoff 12

|}

First leg

|}

Second leg

|}

Playoff 6

|}

First leg

|}

Second leg

|}

Final Four
Organizer:  Sisley Treviso
 Place: Treviso
All times on 25 March are Central European Time (UTC+01:00) and all times on 26 March are Central European Summer Time (UTC+02:00).

Semifinals

|}

3rd place match

|}

Final

|}

Final standings

Awards

Most Valuable Player
  Alessandro Fei (Sisley Treviso)
Best Scorer
  Clayton Stanley (Iraklis Thessaloniki) 
Best Spiker
  Thomas Hoff (Iraklis Thessaloniki) 
Best Server
  Alessandro Fei (Sisley Treviso)

Best Blocker
  Gustavo Endres (Sisley Treviso)
Best Libero
  Aleksey Verbov (Lokomotiv Belgorod)
Best Setter
  Valerio Vermiglio (Sisley Treviso)

External links
 2005/06 European Champions League

CEV Champions League
2005 in volleyball
2006 in volleyball